The bicolored flowerpecker (Dicaeum bicolor) is a species of bird in the family Dicaeidae. 
It is endemic to the Philippines.

Habitat 
Its natural habitat is  tropical moist lowland forest and more rarely on tropical moist montane forests of up to 2,250 meters above sea level. They often form mixed flocks with other flowerpecker species, white-eyes, sunbirds, fantails and other small forest birds.

Description  

Small, short thick bill, sexes differ, in inexpectatum male upperparts glossy blue black; throat, center of breast, belly, and under tail coverts white; sides and flanks light grey;  white. female upperparts olive green; underparts light olive grey; center of breast and belly yellowish white; pectoral tufts yellow white.

This consists of three subspecies

 D. b. bicolor:  Leyte, Samar, Mindanao and Bohol
 D. b. inexpectatum  Luzon, Mindoro and Catanduanes
 D. b. viridissimum: Panay, Negros and Guimaras (extinct)

References

bicolored flowerpecker
Endemic birds of the Philippines
bicolored flowerpecker
bicolored flowerpecker
bicolored flowerpecker
Taxonomy articles created by Polbot